Creeting St Mary Windmill is a Grade II listed dovecote at Creeting St Mary, Suffolk, England which has been restored. It was originally the body of a post mill which stood elsewhere in the village.

History

The mill was dismantled c1860, and the body was moved to the grounds of the medieval hall known as Houghton Park Farm, now The Old Hall. The Mill was part of the complex of outbuildings, which later became Alder Carr Farm. The mill had Patent sails, which were transferred to a tower mill at Kersey when the mill was dismantled. It served for many years as a dovecote. It is the only such example of a reused windmill buck remaining in the country. The building was derelict by the late 1970s but was restored in 1995, and moved to a new position on the farm, converted to a craft workshop. The buck retains all its original framing.

Description

Creeting St Mary Windmill was a post mill with four Patent sails.

Public access
Alder Carr Farm is open every day 9:00 to 17:00 except Christmas Day, Boxing Day and New Year's Day. The mill building is currently home to Halfpenny Home Haberdashery and all areas are open to the public Tuesday to Saturday from 10:00 to 16:00 and after Easter also on Sundays from 10:00 to 16:00.

References

Windmills in Suffolk
Post mills in the United Kingdom
Windmills completed in 1796
Grinding mills in the United Kingdom
Grade II listed buildings in Suffolk
Grade II listed windmills
Creeting St Mary
1796 establishments in England